CJEG-FM is a Canadian radio station that broadcasts a CHR/Top 40 format at 101.3 FM in Bonnyville, Alberta, branded as Hot 101.3. The station is owned by Stingray Group.

The station was licensed by the CRTC on March 10, 2006. Testing began on May 5 and the station officially began broadcasting two weeks later (May 19) as Kool 101.3.

On October 7, 2019, CJEG was rebranded as Hot 101.3 but kept the same format.

Former logo

References

External links
Hot 101.3
CJEG History - Canadian Communications Foundation

Jeg
Jeg
Jeg
Radio stations established in 2006
2006 establishments in Alberta